This is a list of episodes from The Scooby-Doo Show. The episode titles given for the show reflect Hanna-Barbera studio records, as no on-screen titles were given for most episodes.

Episodes

Season 1 (1976, as part of The Scooby-Doo/Dynomutt Hour)

Season 2 (1977, as part of Scooby's All-Star Laff-A-Lympics)

Season 3 (1978, as Scooby-Doo, and segments of Scooby's All-Stars)

See also 
 
 

Lists of Scooby-Doo television series episodes
Lists of American children's animated television series episodes
Lists of American comedy television series episodes